Bjornstadt Bay is a small bay lying  northeast of Gold Harbour, along the east coast of South Georgia. The name dates back to at least 1929.

References 

Bays of South Georgia